Margaret Nakashuk is a Canadian politician from Pangnirtung, Nunavut. She was elected to the Legislative Assembly of Nunavut in the 2017 general election. She represents the electoral district of Pangnirtung.

References

Members of the Legislative Assembly of Nunavut
Women MLAs in Nunavut
Inuit politicians
Living people
Year of birth missing (living people)
21st-century Canadian politicians
21st-century Canadian women politicians
Inuit from the Northwest Territories
Inuit from Nunavut
Canadian Inuit women
People from Pangnirtung